The Scheduled Tribes recognised by the state of Uttar Pradesh in India comprise the following as of 2017:

Agariya (in the district of Sonbhadra)
Baiga (in the district of Sonbhadra)
Bhotia
Bhuiya, Bhuinya (in the district of Sonbhadra)
Buksa
Chero (in the districts of Sonbhadra and Varanasi)
Gond, Dhuriya, Ojha, Nayak, Pathari, Raj Gond (in the districts of Maharajganj, Sidharth Nagar, Basti, Gorakhpur, Deoria, Mau, Azamgarh, Jaunpur, Ballia, Ghazipur, Varanasi, Mirzapur, Sant Kabir Nagar, Kushinagar, Chandauli and Bhadohi)
Jaunsari
Kharwar, Khairwar (in the districts of Deoria, Ballia, Ghazipur, Varanasi and Sonbhadra)
Pankha, Panika (in the districts of Sonbhadra and Mirzapur)
Parahiya (in the district of Sonbhadra)
Patari (in the district of Sonbhadra)
Raji
Saharia (in the district of Lalitpur)

References 

 The Ministry of Tribal Affairs, The Scheduled Castes and Scheduled Tribes Orders (Amendment) Act, 2002 (No. 10 of 2003) dated 7th January, 2003)
 https://tribal.nic.in/downloads/CLM/CLM_1/20.pdf
 Addition of Gond, Dhuriya, Nayak, Raj Gond, Ojha, Pathariin Districts - Sant Kabir Nagar, Kushinagar, Chandauli and Bhadohi